The 2017 FIFA Club World Cup (officially known as the FIFA Club World Cup UAE 2017 presented by Alibaba Cloud for sponsorship reasons) was the 14th edition of the FIFA Club World Cup, a FIFA-organised international club football tournament between the winners of the six continental confederations, as well as the host nation's league champions. The tournament was hosted by the United Arab Emirates.

Real Madrid were the defending champions. They qualified for the tournament as the winners of the 2016–17 UEFA Champions League, becoming the first defending champions to qualify for the subsequent tournament, and after defeating Grêmio 1–0 in the final, became the first team to successfully defend the title.

Host bids
The application process for the 2017–2018 as well as the 2015–2016 editions, i.e. two hosts, each hosting two years, began in February 2014. Member associations interested in hosting must submit a declaration of interest by 30 March 2014, and provide the complete set of bidding documents by 25 August 2014. The FIFA Executive Committee was to select the hosts at their meeting in Morocco in December 2014, but the final decision was delayed until the FIFA's executive committee meetings on 19–20 March 2015.

The following countries expressed an interest in bidding to host the tournament:
 
 
 

The FIFA Executive Committee officially confirmed the United Arab Emirates as hosts of the 2017 and 2018 tournaments on 20 March 2015 during their meeting in Zürich, Switzerland.

Qualified teams

Notes

Venues
The two venues were the Zayed Sports City Stadium in Abu Dhabi and the Hazza bin Zayed Stadium in Al Ain.

Match officials
A total of six referees, twelve assistant referees, and eight video assistant referees were appointed for the tournament.

Organization
The following were key milestones in the organization of the tournament:
The official emblem of the tournament, as well as the match schedule, was unveiled on 11 April 2017.

Squads

Each team had to name a 23-man squad (three of whom must be goalkeepers). Injury replacements were allowed until 24 hours before the team's first match. The official squads were confirmed by FIFA on 30 November 2017.

Matches
The draw was held on 9 October 2017, 12:00 GST (UTC+4), at Abu Dhabi to determine the matchups of the second round, and which teams the two second round winners would play in the semi-finals. At the time of the draw, the identity of the teams representing AFC, CAF, and CONMEBOL were not known.

If a match was tied after normal playing time:
For elimination matches, extra time would be played. If still tied after extra time, a penalty shoot-out would be held to determine the winners.
For matches for fifth place and third place, extra time would not be played and a penalty shoot-out would be held to determine the winners.

All times were local, GST (UTC+4).

First round

Second round

Match for fifth place

Semi-finals

Match for third place

Final

Goalscorers

Awards

The following awards were given at the conclusion of the tournament.

FIFA also named a man of the match for the best player in each game at the tournament.

Broadcasting rights
 : Rede Globo, SporTV and Fox Sports
 : CCTV-5, PPTV and Youku
 Europe: EBU
 Hispanic America: Fox Sports
 : i-Cable and Fantastic TV
 : Neo Prime and Neo Sports
 : Nippon TV
 Middle East: beIN Sports
 : La 1
 : Fox Sports and Telemundo

References

External links
FIFA Club World Cup UAE 2017, FIFA.com

 
2017
2017 in association football
2017
2017–18 in Emirati football
December 2017 sports events in Asia
Sport in Al Ain
Sports competitions in Abu Dhabi